The 2012–13 TFF Third League (also known as Spor-Toto Third League due to sponsorship reasons) is the 12th season of the league since its establishment in 2001 as the fourth level division; and the 42nd season of the third league in Turkish football since its establishment in 1967–68 (before 2001 league was played as third level division). The start date of the league is 8 September 2012 and end date is 19 May 2013.

League was started with 54 teams in three groups: Groups 1, 2 and 3, each consisting 18. Winner of each group promoted to 2013–14 TFF Second League. A playoff series was played among the best four teams in each group to determine the three more teams to promote. Bottom three teams in each groups relegated to 2013–14 Turkish Regional Amateur League.

TFF Third League 2012-13 clubs

 Group 1: Anadolu Üsküdar 1908, Ankara Demirspor, Belediye Vanspor, Bergama Belediyespor, Beşikdüzüspor, Çorumspor, Diyarbakır BB, Fatih Karagümrük, Gölcükspor, İstanbulspor, Kastamonuspor, Kayseri Şekerspor, Kırıkhanspor, Orhangazispor, Pazarspor, Sandıklıspor, Siirtspor, Tekirova Belediyespor.
 Group 2: Adıyamanspor, Aydınspor 1923, Batman Petrolspor, Belediye Bingölspor, Bursa Nilüferspor, Çanakkale Dardanelspor, Derince Belediyespor, Sivas Dört Eylül Belediyespor, Gebzespor, Hacettepe, İskenderunspor 1967, Kilimli Belediyespor, Manavgat Evrensekispor, Menemen Belediyespor, Refahiyespor, Silivrispor, Trabzon Kanuni FK, Ümraniyespor.
 Group 3: Altınordu, Arsinspor, Beylerbeyi, Çorum Belediyespor, Darıca Gençlerbirliği, Diyarbakırspor, Elazığ Belediyespor, Emrespor, Erzurum BB, Gümüşhanespor, Kahramanmaraş Belediyespor, Keçiörengücü, Kocaelispor, Maltepe, Mardinspor, Oyak Renaultspor, Sancaktepe Belediyespor, Yimpaş Yozgatspor.

Group 1

Results

Promotion Playoffs

Semifinals

Finals

Group 2

Results

Promotion Playoffs

Semifinals

Finals

Group 3

Results

Promotion Playoffs

Semifinals

Finals

References

See also
 2012–13 Turkish Cup
 2012–13 Süper Lig
 2012–13 TFF First League
 2012–13 TFF Second League

4
Turk
TFF Third League seasons